Halladay Farmhouse is a historic home located at Duanesburg in Schenectady County, New York. It was built about 1786 and remodeled in the 1830s in a vernacular Greek Revival style. It is a -story, five-bay frame building with a small 1-story gable-roofed wing.  It features a wide frieze pierced by rectangular eyebrow windows with ornate iron grillwork. Also on the property are two contributing barns, a carriage house, two sheds, and a machine shop building.

The property was covered in a 1984 study of Duanesburg historical resources.
It was listed on the National Register of Historic Places in 1984.

References

Houses on the National Register of Historic Places in New York (state)
Houses in Schenectady County, New York
Greek Revival houses in New York (state)
Houses completed in 1786
National Register of Historic Places in Schenectady County, New York